{{DISPLAYTITLE:C12H10O4}}
The molecular formula C12H14O4 (molar mass: 218.21 g/mol, exact mass: 218.0579 u) may refer to:

 Acifran
 Inotilone
 Piperic acid

Molecular formulas